Dewrance & Co. Ltd was a manufacturer of engine and boiler accessories, such as pumps and gauges.

History
It was established in London in 1835 as a partnership by Joseph Woods, with John Dewrance. It was involved in the building of the locomotive Lion in 1838 for the Liverpool and Manchester Railway.  In 1844 after Wood's death the firm became a company specialising in manufacturing engine and boiler accessories.  It produced a brass pressure gauge for Lloyd's Register of shipping to pressure-test ships' boilers before insuring them.  Such gauges have become collectable. A pair are on display at the Internal Fire – Museum of Power.

Dewrance died in 1861 and left the business to his son.   The firm's introduction of the groove-packed plug cock in 1875 was a major innovation because it made steam safety valves easier to operate. Sir John Dewrance, who was married to the granddaughter of Richard Trevithick took over the business in 1879.     In 1937 after Dewrance's death it became a wholly owned subsidiary of Babcock & Wilcox Ltd.

In 1961 it had  2,000 employees.

The firm was sold by Dresser Industries in 1998 to Tyco International. It was then operating from Skelmersdale.

Dewrance family

John Dewrance

John Dewrance conducted experiments on the distribution of heat in steam boilers. There are claims he was responsible for the construction of George Stephenson’s locomotive the Rocket and for supporting it at the Rainhill trials.  He was appointed Locomotive Superintendent of the Liverpool and Manchester Railway from 1840 to 1844 during which time his  designs at the Edge Hil workshops were noted for their neatness.

In October 1845 he entered the employ of the Great Southern and Western Railway of Ireland and was selected from three candidates as Locomotive Superintendent in March 1847 at a salary of £300 pera anuum with housing assistance.    He was immediately seconded to locomotive manufacturer William Fairbairn & Sons, Millwall, London to gain experience.  Following a review in October 1947 his services were dispensed with due to claim his remuneration was inappropriately high for his abilities.  He was then appointed Locomotive Superintendent by the rival Midland Great Western Railway (MGWR) of Ireland, again for £300 per annum with a house in Cabra Road, Dublin.  Following the decision of the MGWR director's to let the operation of the line Dewrance was released with three months salary.

Dewrance died in 1861 and left the business to his son.

Sir John Dewrance
Sir John Dewrance, who was educated at Charterhouse and then at King's College London before marrying the granddaughter of Richard Trevithick, took over the business in 1879.  He took out 114 patents relating to steam fittings and boiler mountings. He was involved with the Primrose League.  In 1899 he became chairman of Babcock & Wilcox Ltd.  From 1920 to 1926 he was the President of the Engineering Employers’ Federation.

Dewrance died in 1937 with the firm becoming a wholly owned subsidiary of Babcock & Wilcox Ltd.

The Sir John Dewrance prize is awarded to the two best mechanical engineering students each year at City University.

Recognition
One of the GWR Hawthorn Class locomotives built by Slaughter, Grüning and Company was named after the company in 1865. British Empire Medals were awarded to Arthur Edgar Caswallon Evans, a Brass Turner in the 1946 New Year Honours, to Jasper Sidney Jeal, a Centre Lathe Turner in the 1953 Coronation Honours and to Maud Unwin, a Fettler, in the 1956 New Year Honours. James McWaters Storey, the Managing Director, was appointed Commander of the Order of the British Empire in the 1959 New Year Honours.

The firm's archives are held in the British National Archives.

Notes

References

 
Dewrance Sir J 1912, letter to Science Museum, Nominal file 565
 
Hastings R 1843, The Chemist, Volume 4
Knight J & Lacey H 1844, The Mechanics Magazine, Volume 41
 
 
 
Thomas, R.H.G. 1960, The Liverpool & Manchester Railway, Batsford, London
Transactions 1938, Institution of Engineers and Shipbuilders in Scotland, Volume 81
 </ref>

Manufacturing companies based in London
1835 establishments in England
Manufacturing companies established in 1835
British companies established in 1835

Further reading